Desirable is a 1934 American drama film directed by Archie Mayo and starring Jean Muir and George Brent. It was released by Warner Bros. The film follows the story of Lois (Jean Muir), the 19-year-old daughter of a famous actress (Verree Teasdale), who has been hidden away at boarding school to protect her mother's image. A scarlet-fever quarantine sends her home to New York City, full of innocent enthusiasm, only to be betrayed by her mother, by the arrogant egotists of her mother's theatrical world and by the haughty social snobs in the upper-crust family whose son her mother persuades her to marry. Mac (George Brent), a friend of her mother's, initially plays an avuncular role. By the end of the film, Lois and Mac realize that they are in love.

Plot
Helen Walbridge (Verree Teasdale) is a famous actress who does not want her true age to be known. She, therefore, keeps her 19-year-old daughter (Jean Muir) secreted away in a boarding school.

Cast
 Verree Teasdale as Helen Walbridge 
 Jean Muir as Lois Johnson 
 George Brent as Stuart 'Mac' McAllister 
 John Halliday as Austin Stevens 
 Charles Starrett as Russell 'Russ' Gray 
 Russell Hopton as Chet 
 Joan Wheeler as Barbara, 'Babs' 
 Barbara Leonard as Margaret, Gray's Maid 
 Virginia Hammond as Mrs. Emily Gray
 Pauline True as Mac's Secretary

References

External links

1934 films
American romantic drama films
American black-and-white films
Films directed by Archie Mayo
Warner Bros. films
1934 romantic drama films
1930s American films
Films scored by Bernhard Kaun
Films scored by Heinz Roemheld
Films scored by Ray Heindorf
Films set in New York City
Films about actors
Films about mother–daughter relationships